Rosegaferro  is a town in the Veneto, in northeast Italy. It is a frazione of the comune of Villafranca di Verona, in the province of Verona. It has a population of around 1300.

History
The parish church was constructed in 1754 and was widened to a Latin Cross architecture in 1952.

Notes and references

Frazioni of the Province of Verona
Cities and towns in Veneto